Mangal Singh Champia (born 9 November 1983, in Jamshedpur) is an Indian archer, who won multiple medals in several International event, including Asian Games. He was conferred with the Arjuna award by President of India for the year 2009.

Mangal started archery in the year 1995 and became pro in 2008.

He has secured 2016 Rio Olympics berth.

Other achievements
 15th Asian Archery Championships, China:  Men's Team Event

  3rd Asian Grand Prix, Iran

  2nd Commonwealth Archery Championships, India

  3rd Asian Archery Grand Prix Tournament, Indonesia

 2010 Asian Games: Men's Team Event

 15th Asian Archery Championships, China:  Individual Event

2008 Summer Olympics
At the 2008 Summer Olympics in Beijing Champia finished his ranking round with a total of 678 points, just one point behind Juan René Serrano and equal with Viktor Ruban and scoring more bull's eyes than Serrano. This gave him the second seed for the final competition bracket in which he faced Hojjatollah Vaezi in the first round, beating the Iranian 112-98. In the second round Champia faced 31st seed Bair Badënov, but was unable to beat the Russian who won with 109-108. Badënov went on to win the bronze medal.

See also
Indian Squad for 2008 Olympics

External links
 Beijing Olympics 08 Archery Results for Individuals
 Beijing Olympics Biography

References

Living people
1983 births
Indian male archers
Olympic archers of India
Archers at the 2008 Summer Olympics
Recipients of the Arjuna Award
People from Jamshedpur
Archers from Jharkhand
Asian Games medalists in archery
Archers at the 1998 Asian Games
Archers at the 2006 Asian Games
Archers at the 2010 Asian Games
Asian Games bronze medalists for India
Medalists at the 2006 Asian Games
Medalists at the 2010 Asian Games